Clotaire Guillon (5 January 1890 – 20 October 1942) was a French racing cyclist. He rode in the 1921 Tour de France.

References

1890 births
1942 deaths
French male cyclists
Place of birth missing